

The Evangelistas Islets (Spanish: Islotes Evangelistas) comprise a group of four small, rocky islands lying on the Chilean continental shelf, some 30 km north-west of the western entrance to the Strait of Magellan, in the south-eastern Pacific Ocean, facing the full force of the "Furious Fifties". They come under the jurisdiction of the Chilean Navy which operates the Chilean Maritime Signalling Service and has maintained a presence there since the establishment of the Evangelistas Lighthouse in 1896 by Scottish engineer George Henry Slight.

On February 17, 1676, sixteen men of Pascual de Iriate's expedition were lost at Evangelistas Islets while attempting to install a bronze plaque indicating the areas ownership by the King of Spain.

Description
The other, uninhabited, islets are Elcano , Lobos , and Pan de Azúcar . They are mainly bare rock with steep cliffs on their western sides and are exposed to strong winds and rough seas. Lobos and Elcano are home to breeding colonies of black-browed albatrosses with a combined estimate of 4670 pairs recorded in a 13 October 2002 aerial survey. The islets have been recognised as an Important Bird Area (IBA) by BirdLife International for their albatross colonies.

Climate

See also
 List of islands of Chile

References

External links
 Elsio Hugo Cárcamo Velásquez Faro Evangelista in historianaval.cl
 Islands of Chile @ United Nations Environment Programme
 World island information @ WorldIslandInfo.com
 South America Island High Points above 1000 meters
 United States Hydrographic Office, South America Pilot (1916)

Archipelagoes of Chile
Seabird colonies
Islands of Magallanes Region
Archipelagoes of the Pacific Ocean
Important Bird Areas of Chile
Important Bird Areas of Oceania